Benedictus Deus is a papal bull issued in 1336 by Pope Benedict XII.

This dogma, widely recited in Thomas Aquinas' Summa Theologiae, defined the Church's belief that the souls of the departed go to their eternal reward immediately after death, as opposed to remaining in a state of unconscious existence until the Last Judgment.

See also 
 Beatific vision

References

Sources

Further reading
Benedictus Deus on papalencyclicals.net
Benedictus Deus in Latin on the Holy See's website

14th-century papal bulls
1336 in Europe
Christianity and death